Jenišov is a municipality and village in Karlovy Vary District in the Karlovy Vary Region of the Czech Republic. It has about 1,100 inhabitants.

Administrative parts
The hamlet of Pod Rohem is an administrative part of Jenišov.

References

Villages in Karlovy Vary District